Aaron was a younger son of the last Tsar of the First Bulgarian Empire, Ivan Vladislav. After the Byzantine conquest of Bulgaria he entered Byzantine service along with his brothers, and held a series of higher military commands in the eastern provinces of the Byzantine Empire during the 1040s and 1050s, rising from patrikios to protoproedros in the process. In this capacity, he fought in the first battles against the invading Seljuq Turks, as well as, unsuccessfully, against the uprising in 1057 of his brother-in-law Isaac I Komnenos. The Aaronios noble family was named after him, and included his descendants, as well as the descendants of his siblings.

Life
He was the third son of Ivan Vladislav and Maria. He had two older brothers, Presian and Alusian, as well as three younger ones, and six sisters. After the death of Ivan Vladislav in February 1018, Bulgarian resistance to the decades-long attacks of the Byzantine emperor Basil II collapsed, and Aaron with his two older brothers fled to Mount Tmoros in Tomornitsa. Basil surrounded the mountain with troops, and the three brothers eventually surrendered, after receiving guarantees for their safety. Presian received the high title of magistros (suggesting that he was the eldest son, and his father's heir)), while Alusian and Aaron received the slightly lower title of patrikios.

Military career
During this time Aaron, alongside Katakalon Kekaumenos, the katepano of Ani, faced the first large-scale invasions of the Seljuq Turks into Byzantine-held Armenia. The first invasion, led by Hasan the Deaf, was destroyed by the two Byzantine commanders east of Lake Van in 1048.

Hasan's attack was soon followed by an even larger expedition, led by Ibrahim Inal, which the local Byzantine forces were unable to counter. According to the historian John Skylitzes, contrary to Kekaumenos, who wanted to confront the Turks as soon as possible, Aaron favoured a more defensive stance, withdrawing behind their fortifications and conserving their forces, while informing Emperor Constantine IX and requesting instructions. Aaron's opinion prevailed, and the Byzantines left the Turks unmolested while they awaited the arrival of reinforcements led by the Georgian prince Liparit. As a result of this inactivity, the Turks were able to raid widely and inflict much destruction, culminating in the dramatic Sack of Artze. After Liparit arrived, the combined army confronted the Turks in the Battle of Kapetron: in a fierce nocturnal engagement, Aaron and Kekaumenos, in command of the two flanks, pushed back and pursued the Turks "till cock's crow". In the centre, however, Inal managed to capture Liparit, which the two Byzantine commanders would not learn until the next day. Inal was able to retreat with his captives and booty to Seljuq territory, leaving the two Byzantine commanders with no option but to return to their respective bases.

During the uprising of the eastern generals under his brother-in-law Isaac I Komnenos in 1057, Aaron remained loyal to Emperor Michael VI, and commanded the left flank of the Imperial army at the decisive Battle of Hades. During the battle, his men routed their opponents and pressed on to their camp, but Aaron hesitated to complete his victory, allowing the rebel army time to reverse the situation and defeat the Imperial forces. The rebel victory quickly led to the accession of Isaac I to the throne.

In  he is attested in the testament of Eustathios Boilas as proedros (and presumably doux) in Mesopotamia, then held the office of protostrator along that of doux (the exact command is not specified), and finally, after 1059, the title of protoproedros.

Family
Aaron gave his name to the noble Byzantine family of Aaron or Aaronios (plural: Aaronioi). The family was held to include not only Aaron's descendants, but all descendants of his father John Vladislav; including the Alousianoi, the descendants of his brother Alusian. His son Theodore, governor of Taron, was killed fighting against the Seljuk Turks in 1055/56. He had possibly one other son, Radomir Aaron. From Aaron's younger siblings, the family became closely intermarried with the Komnenos dynasty: his sister Catherine married Isaac Komnenos, the uncle of Emperor Alexios I Komnenos, while the daughter of his younger brother Troian married Andronikos Doukas, the father-in-law of Alexios I.

References

Sources
 
 

 
 
 

11th-century Bulgarian people
11th-century Byzantine people
11th-century deaths
Bulgarian people of the Byzantine–Bulgarian Wars
Bulgarian princes
Byzantine generals
Byzantine governors
Aaronios family
Magistroi
Patricii
Prisoners and detainees of the Byzantine Empire
Year of birth unknown
Year of death unknown
Byzantine people of Bulgarian descent
Basil II
Byzantine people of the Byzantine–Seljuk wars
Byzantine governors of Vaspurakan